Zero Hour may refer to:

 Midnight, or 00:00
 Zero hour (1945), the capitulation of the Nazi government at midnight May 8, 1945
 Zero Hour (military designation), the scheduled time for the start of some event, especially a military operation

Film, television and radio
 The Zero Hour (1939 film), an American film directed by Sidney Salkow
 Zero Hour (1944 film), a 1944 Canadian documentary film
 Zero Hour!, a 1957 film written by Arthur Hailey, later parodied as Airplane!
 Zero Hour (1977 film), a 1977 West German film directed by Edgar Reitz
 The Zero Hour (2010 film), a 2010 Venezuelan action film
 "Zero Hour" (Star Trek: Enterprise), a 2004 episode of Star Trek: Enterprise
 "Zero Hour" (Stargate SG-1), a 2004 episode of the science fiction television series Stargate SG-1
 Zero Hour (2004 TV series), a 2004 documentary-style TV show retelling tragic man-made disasters
 Zero Hour (2013 TV series), a 2013 American conspiracy drama series
 "Zero Hour! The Destruction of the Hidden Leaf Village Begins!", a 2004 episode of Naruto
 The Zero Hour (Japanese radio series), a radio program broadcast by Japan in World War II
 The Zero Hour (U.S. radio series), a 1973–74 radio drama series hosted by Rod Serling
 "Zero Hour", an episode of the animated television series Star Wars Rebels

Literature
 Zero Hour: Crisis in Time!, a 1994 DC Comics comic book miniseries and crossover storyline
 Zero Hour, a 1997 financial espionage thriller by Joseph Finder
 Zero Hour (play), a 2006 play by Jim Brochu about the life of actor Zero Mostel
 "Zero Hour", a story told in the Galileo Simulator at the Christa McAuliffe Space Education Center
 "Zero Hour", a short story by Ray Bradbury appearing in The Illustrated Man
 "Zero Hour - Over the Top", a fictional populist manifesto by the demagogue Buzz Windrip in It Can't Happen Here
 Zero Hour (novel), a 1928 autobiographical novel by Georg Grabenhorst
Zero Hour (Cussler novel), a 2013 mystery novel by Clive Cussler

Music
 Zero Hour (band), a progressive metal band
 Zero Hour (Eidolon album), 1996
 Zero Hour (Zero Hour album), 1999
 Zero Hour (Avengers album), 2003
 "Zero Hour", a song on Noirs 2005 soundtrack
 "Zero Hour", a song by 'Avengers' on 1979 album Zero Hour (Avengers album)
 "Zero Hour", a song by the Plimsouls on the 1981 album The Plimsouls
 "The Zero Hour", a song on Project One's 2008 album Project One: The Album
 Zero Hour Records, a New York City-based record label founded in 1990
 "Hora Zero", a song on Rodrigo y Gabriela's 2009 album 11:11
 Tango: Zero Hour, a 1986 album by Ástor Piazzolla

Video games
 Command & Conquer: Generals – Zero Hour, a 2003 real-time strategy video game
 Duke Nukem: Zero Hour, a 1999 third-person shooter
 Zero Hour: America's Medic, a 2009 game designed to train and exercise first responders
 Modern Combat 4: Zero Hour, a 2012 first-person shooter for iOS
 Firewall: Zero Hour, a 2018 VR first-person shooter

Other uses
 Zero Hour (activist organization), a U.S. youth organization dedicated to climate change activism, co-directed by Jamie Margolin

See also
 Zero-hour contract
 One Hour to Zero, a 1976 film
 Zero day (disambiguation)